Cnicht is a mountain in Snowdonia which forms part of the Moelwynion mountain range.

Features 
Its appearance when viewed from the south-west, i.e. from the direction of Porthmadog, has earned it the sobriquet the "Matterhorn of Wales", albeit being 3,789 metres lower. In reality Cnicht is a long ridge and, at 689 m, is the fifth-highest peak in the Moelwynion mountain range.  It can be easily ascended from Croesor, the village at its foot, or, with more difficulty, from Nant Gwynant to the north-west.

Although regarded by some as a mountain in its own right, Cnicht does not have the required 150m of topographic prominence to be classed as a Marilyn.

Toponymy 
The mountain's name is thought to derive from the English surname Knight, the name of a family who were formerly merchants in Caernarfon.

In fiction 
It appears as the "Saeth" in Patrick O'Brian's 1952 novel Three Bear Witness (published as Testimonies in the USA), which is set in a fictionalised version of Cwm Croesor.  O'Brian and his wife lived in the valley between 1946 and 1949.

References

External links

www.geograph.co.uk : photos of Cnicht and surrounding area

Mountains and hills of Snowdonia
Hewitts of Wales
Nuttalls
Mountains and hills of Gwynedd
Beddgelert
Llanfrothen